Hypercompe euripides is a moth of the family Erebidae first described by Harrison Gray Dyar Jr. in 1912. It is found in Mexico.

References

Hypercompe
Moths described in 1912